= Soner Türker =

Turkish actor

- Born: January 1, 1980
- Occupation: Actor
- Years active: 2010–present

Soner Türker (born 1 January 1980) is a Turkish actor known for his roles in Turkish television series and films. He gained wider recognition for portraying Selman Korkmaz in the television series Eşkıya Dünyaya Hükümdar Olmaz.

== Early life and career ==
Türker began his acting career in theatre, appearing in several local stage productions before transitioning to television and film.

He became known to Turkish audiences through his role as Selman Korkmaz in the television crime drama Eşkıya Dünyaya Hükümdar Olmaz.

In addition to television work, Türker has appeared in Turkish films such as Sırrını Biliyorum and Bodrum Seferi, both of which were covered in Turkish media during their premieres.

== Filmography ==
=== Television ===
Year	Title	Role
	Eşkıya Dünyaya Hükümdar Olmaz	Selman Korkmaz

=== Film ===
Year	Title
2024	Sırrını Biliyorum
2024	Bodrum Seferi
